Leon Calvin Murray (born October 18, 1958 in Middle Township, New Jersey) is a former American football running back.  He was drafted by the Philadelphia Eagles the National Football League in the fourth round of the 1981 draft and played from 1981 to 1982 for the Eagles. He also played in 1983 for the Chicago Blitz of the United States Football League.

Born in Middle Township, New Jersey and raised in Woodbine, Murray attended Millville Senior High School. He played college football at Ohio State University.

College career
In a game against Washington State on September 22, 1979, Murray set an Ohio State Buckeyes record for longest pass reception when he caught an 86-yard pass from Art Schlichter. Murray led the Buckeyes in rushing in 1979 and 1980. He led the Big Ten in rushing in 1980. He was voted as Ohio State's most valuable player by his teammates in 1980.

Professional career

Philadelphia Eagles
Murray was drafted by the Philadelphia Eagles in the fourth round of the 1981 NFL Draft. He was released prior to the start of the 1981 season, but was re-signed on October 28 when Louie Giammona was knocked out for the remainder of the season with a knee injury. During the 1981 season he appeared in 7 games, in which he rushed 23 times for 134 yards, caught one pass for 7 yards, and returned one kickoff for 14 yards.

In 1982 he appeared in one game, returning three kickoffs for 42 yards.

Chicago Blitz
In 1983, Murray signed with the Chicago Blitz of the United States Football League and was the 12th highest rusher in the league that year.

Personal

Since retiring from football, Murray has resided in Columbus, Ohio.  He spent several years as a purchasing manager for Franklin University in downtown Columbus.

Murray's son, Cal, is a former running back for the Miami RedHawks. He was drafted by Rhein Fire in the 22nd round of the 2007 NFL Europa Free Agent Draft.

Murray converted to Orthodox Judaism and adopted the Hebrew name Yosef.

References

1958 births
Living people
Sportspeople from Cape May County, New Jersey
People from Middle Township, New Jersey
People from Woodbine, New Jersey
Millville Senior High School alumni
Players of American football from New Jersey
American football running backs
Ohio State Buckeyes football players
Philadelphia Eagles players
Chicago Blitz players
Jewish American sportspeople
21st-century American Jews